El Impulso is the fourth studio album by Uruguayan rock/ska band La Vela Puerca. It was released in April, 2007. The album was recorded and mixed by Julio Berta in the period November/December, 2006. The recording took place in three different studios: Panda Studios in Buenos Aires, Argentina, IFU in Montevideo, Uruguay, and Casa Blanca in Atlántida, Uruguay. However, the mixing occurred during February, 2007. El Impulso was mastered in Los Angeles, California, USA by Tom Baker. It was artistically produced by Juan Campodónico.
The song "Frágil", was released as a single on Thursday, March 29, 2007. "El Señor", the second single, was released in early 2008, along with its music video.

Track listing

 Frágil
 El "Señor"
 Su Ración
 Neutro
 Me Pierdo
 Clones
 Colabore
 Para No Verme Más
 Con El Destino
 Sanar
 Pino
 La Sin Razón
 Hoy Tranquilo

References

2007 albums
La Vela Puerca albums